Jeon Ji-Soo (Hangul: 전지수, Hanja: 全志秀) (born December 13, 1985) is a South Korean short track speed skater.

Jeon first gained attention at the 2005 World Junior Short Track Speed Skating Championships in Belgrade, where she won overall runner-up and a gold medal in the 1000 metres.

In 2007, Jeon was selected for the South Korea national team and competed in the World Championships and World Team Championships as a member of the 3000 metre relay squad, where she won gold medals in both events.

In 2011, Jeon was again called up to the South Korea national team, ranked first overall in the 500 metres of the 2010-11 national season. She earned a gold medal in the 3000 metre relay event at the 2011 Winter Universiade held in Erzurum, Turkey.

She currently belongs to the Gangneung City Government short track speed skating team.

References

1985 births
Living people
South Korean female short track speed skaters
Asian Games medalists in short track speed skating
Asian Games silver medalists for South Korea
Short track speed skaters at the 2007 Asian Winter Games
Medalists at the 2007 Asian Winter Games
Universiade medalists in short track speed skating
Universiade gold medalists for South Korea
Competitors at the 2011 Winter Universiade
21st-century South Korean women